Odechów may refer to the following places in Poland:
Odechów, Łódź Voivodeship (central Poland)
Odechów, Masovian Voivodeship (east-central Poland)